Mak Pui Hin (born 6 March 1978) is a squash player from Hong Kong, China who won a bronze medal at the 2006 Asian Games in the women's squash singles event.

External links 
 
 

Living people
1978 births
Hong Kong female squash players
Asian Games medalists in squash
Squash players at the 1998 Asian Games
Squash players at the 2002 Asian Games
Squash players at the 2006 Asian Games
Asian Games bronze medalists for Hong Kong
Medalists at the 2006 Asian Games